The 2022–23 season is the 96th season in the history of ACF Fiorentina and their 19th consecutive season in the top flight. The club are participating in Serie A, the Coppa Italia, and the UEFA Europa Conference League.

Players

Transfers

In

Loans in

Out

Loans out

Pre-season and friendlies

Competitions

Overall record

Serie A

League table

Results summary

Results by round

Matches 
The league fixtures were announced on 24 June 2022.

Coppa Italia

UEFA Europa Conference League

Play-off round

Group stage

The draw for the group stage was held on 27 August 2022.

Knockout phase

Knockout round play-offs
The knockout round play-offs draw was held on 7 November 2022.

Round of 16
The round of 16 draw was held on 24 February 2023.

Quarter-finals
The quarter-finals draw was held on 17 March 2023.

Squad statistics

|-
! colspan=14 style="background:#9400D3; color:#FFFFFF; text-align:center"| Goalkeepers

|-
! colspan=14 style="background:#9400D3; color:#FFFFFF; text-align:center"| Defenders

|-
! colspan=14 style="background:#9400D3; color:#FFFFFF; text-align:center"| Midfielders

|-
! colspan=14 style="background:#9400D3; color:#FFFFFF; text-align:center"| Forwards

|-
! colspan=14 style="background:#9400D3; color:#FFFFFF; text-align:center"| Players transferred out during the season

References

ACF Fiorentina seasons
Fiorentina
Fiorentina